The Guntakal–Bangalore section railway line connects the town of Guntakal in Andhra Pradesh  with Bangalore of Karnataka state capital. Further, this section connects Bangalore with several north Indian towns and cities.

Major stations
This section serves the towns of Gooty, Anantapur, Dharmavaram, Puttaparthi and Hindupur in Andhra Pradesh State and this line enters into Karnataka state at Vidurashwatha.

References

5 ft 6 in gauge railways in India
Rail transport in Andhra Pradesh
Rail transport in Karnataka
Guntakal railway division
Bangalore railway division
Transport in Guntakal
Transport in Bangalore